D*** may refer to:
 Damn, as a profanity
 Dick (slang)